Periphilin-1 is a protein that in humans is encoded by the PPHLN1 gene.

The protein encoded by this gene is one of the several proteins that become sequentially incorporated into the cornified cell envelope during the terminal differentiation of keratinocyte at the outer layers of epidermis. 

This protein interacts with periplakin, which is known as a precursor of the cornified cell envelope. The cellular localization pattern and insolubility of this protein suggest that it may play a role in epithelial differentiation and contribute to epidermal integrity and barrier formation. Multiple alternatively spliced transcript variants encoding distinct isoforms have been observed.

References

Further reading